Bitvise is a proprietary secure remote access software developed for Windows and available as a client and server. The software is based on the Secure Shell (SSH) protocol, which provides a secure channel over an insecure network in a client-server architecture.

Technology 
Bitvise software implements version 2 of the Secure Shell (SSH) protocol, SFTP versions 3, 4, and 6, as well as SCP and FTPS according to publicly available standards.

Development 
The software is developed and published by Bitvise Limited. The first released product was Bitvise SSH Server, then named WinSSHD, in 2001, and it was shortly followed by Tunnelier, now Bitvise SSH Client. There have been 8 major releases of the software so far.

Features 
Both the server and client work with all desktop and server versions of Windows and allow for remote-based access using a tool like WinVNC. They provide a GUI as well as command-line interface to support SFTP, SSH, SCP, and VPN using the TCP/IP tunneling feature.

The software among other supports GSSAPI-enabled Kerberos 5 exchange and NTLM Kerberos 5 user authentication. It provides two-factor authentication and compatibility with RFC 6238 authenticator apps.

See also 

 Comparison of SSH clients
 Comparison of SSH servers

References

External links 

 Official website

Computer_security_software
Windows software